Harry Louis Moffatt (1839 – 20 May 1913) was a notable New Zealand sailor, goldminer, storekeeper, wharfinger and writer. He was born in London, England, in 1839.

References

1839 births
1913 deaths
New Zealand writers
New Zealand sailors
English emigrants to New Zealand